General elections were held in Southern Rhodesia on 5 June 1958 for the seats in the Southern Rhodesian Legislative Assembly. Although the Dominion Party received the most votes, the result was a victory for the ruling United Federal Party, which won 17 seats. The revived United Rhodesia Party under the leadership of former Prime Minister Sir Garfield Todd failed to win a single seat.

Results

References

Southern Rhodesia
1958 in Southern Rhodesia
Elections in Southern Rhodesia
Southern Rhodesia
June 1958 events in Africa